The Redstone School is an historic one-room school located in Sudbury, Massachusetts. Built in 1798, it is believed to be the school which Mary Tyler (née Sawyer) took her lamb to in the nursery rhyme "Mary Had a Little Lamb".

At the time of Tyler's attendance at the school, it was located in Sterling, Massachusetts. The property was later purchased by Henry Ford and relocated to a churchyard, on the property of Longfellow's Wayside Inn, where it stands today. Ford operated the school for the benefit of children of his employees at the Wayside Inn.

After closing in 1927, prior to its move, the school reopened for a further twenty-four years, with an average of around sixteen students of grades one through four. It closed permanently in 1951.

The school has windows on the right-hand side and at the rear; its blackboard occupies the interior of the left-hand wall.

References 

Buildings and structures completed in 1798
1798 establishments in Massachusetts
Buildings and structures in Sudbury, Massachusetts
One-room schoolhouses in Massachusetts